Darbandikhan is a town in the governorate of Sulaimaniyah in Kurdistan Region, Iraq. It is situated within the area of autonomy for the Kurdistan region of Iraq, inhabited by the majority of the Kurds. Darbandikhan is located close to Darbandikhan Lake, and on the border with Diyala Province. It has a population of 45,500 as of 2018.

See also
Darbandikhan Dam
Diyala River

References

External links
Map and Photos of Darbandikhan at mapcarta.com

Populated places in Sulaymaniyah Province
Kurdish settlements in Iraq